The 1970 Coppa Italia Final was a final group of the 1969–70 Coppa Italia. From 1968 to 1971, FIGC introduced a final group instead of semi-finals and finals. In the final group, four teams played against each other home-and-away in a round-robin format. The matches were played from 7 May – 10 June 1970. The group winner was Bologna.

Matches

Final group

References 
Coppa Italia 1969/70 statistics at rsssf.com
 https://www.calcio.com/calendario/ita-coppa-italia-1969-1970-finale/2/
 https://www.worldfootball.net/schedule/ita-coppa-italia-1969-1970-finale/2/

Coppa Italia Finals
Coppa Italia Final 1970
Coppa Italia Final 1970